Sympetrum is a genus of small to medium-sized skimmer dragonflies, known as darters in the UK and as meadowhawks in North America. The more than 50 species predominantly live in the temperate zone of the Northern Hemisphere; no Sympetrum species is native to Australia.

Most North American darters fly in late summer and autumn, breeding in ponds and foraging over meadows.  Commonly, they are yellow-gold as juveniles, with mature males and some females becoming bright red on part or all of their bodies.  An exception to this color scheme is the black darter (Sympetrum danae).

The genus includes the following species:

Sympetrum ambiguum  – blue-faced meadowhawk
Sympetrum anomalum 
Sympetrum arenicolor 
Sympetrum baccha 
Sympetrum chaconi 
Sympetrum commixtum 
Sympetrum cordulegaster 
Sympetrum corruptum  – variegated meadowhawk
Sympetrum costiferum  – saffron-winged meadowhawk
Sympetrum croceolum 
Sympetrum daliensis 
Sympetrum danae  – black darter, black meadowhawk
Sympetrum darwinianum 
Sympetrum depressiusculum  – spotted darter
Sympetrum dilatatum  – St. Helena darter
Sympetrum durum 
Sympetrum eroticum 
Sympetrum evanescens 
Sympetrum flaveolum  – yellow-winged darter
Sympetrum fonscolombii  – red-veined darter, nomad
Sympetrum frequens 
Sympetrum gilvum 
Sympetrum gracile 
Sympetrum haematoneura 
Sympetrum haritonovi  – dwarf darter
Sympetrum himalayanum 
Sympetrum hypomelas 
Sympetrum illotum  – cardinal meadowhawk
Sympetrum imitans 
Sympetrum infuscatum 
Sympetrum internum  – cherry-faced meadowhawk
Sympetrum kunckeli 
Sympetrum maculatum 
Sympetrum madidum  – red-veined meadowhawk
Sympetrum meridionale  – southern darter
Sympetrum nigrifemur  – island darter
Sympetrum nigrocreatum  – Talamanca meadowhawk
Sympetrum nomurai 
Sympetrum obtrusum  – white-faced meadowhawk
Sympetrum orientale 
Sympetrum pallipes  – striped meadowhawk
Sympetrum paramo 
Sympetrum parvulum 
Sympetrum pedemontanum  – banded darter
Sympetrum risi 
Sympetrum roraimae 
Sympetrum rubicundulum  – ruby meadowhawk
Sympetrum ruptum 
Sympetrum sanguineum  – ruddy darter
Sympetrum semicinctum  – band-winged meadowhawk
Sympetrum signiferum 
Sympetrum sinaiticum  – desert darter
Sympetrum speciosum 
Sympetrum striolatum  – common darter
Sympetrum tibiale 
Sympetrum uniforme 
Sympetrum verum 
Sympetrum vicinum  – yellow-legged meadowhawk, autumn meadowhawk
Sympetrum villosum 
Sympetrum vulgatum  – vagrant darter, moustached darter
Sympetrum xiaoi

References

Libellulidae
Anisoptera genera
Taxa named by Edward Newman
Animal migration